Ferdous is a Bangladeshi name that may refer to

Ferdous Ahmed, Bangladeshi film actor
Ferdous Ahmed Qurishi, Bangladeshi politician 
Ferdous Ara, Bangladeshi singer 
Ferdous Wahid, Bangladeshi pop singer and film director
Hassan Ferdous (1929–1997), Iranian weightlifter 
Mohammad Ferdous Khan (died 2016), Bangladeshi educationist 
Nasim Ferdous, Bangladeshi diplomat 
Rahatul Ferdous (born 1995), Bangladeshi cricketer 
Tabassum Ferdous Shaon (born c. 1979), Bangladeshi beauty pageant

See also
 Ferdows (disambiguation)

Bangladeshi masculine given names